Classics is a 1999 compilation album by American country music singer Patty Loveless.

The album includes two new tracks: "Can't Get Enough," which was a #21 Billboard Top Country Single, and "I Just Wanna Be Loved by You." Also included is a duet with Vince Gill, "My Kind of Woman, My Kind of Man," a #27 hit, which first appeared on Gill's 1998 album The Key. The rest of the album features her Epic Records hits: three songs from Only What I Feel, three songs from When Fallen Angels Fly, two songs from The Trouble with the Truth, and one from Long Stretch of Lonesome, the George Jones-backed "You Don't Seem to Miss Me." The album went on to be certified Gold for shipments of over 500,000 copies in the US and was Loveless' last album to receive a certification.

Track listing

Personnel on tracks 1 and 4
Adapted from liner notes.

 Dan Dugmore – pedal steel guitar (track 4)
 Stuart Duncan – fiddle
 Paul Franklin – pedal steel guitar
 Steve Gibson – electric guitar
 Emory Gordy Jr. – bass guitar
 Owen Hale – drums
 John Barlow Jarvis – Hammond B-3 organ
 Kostas – background vocals (track 4)
 Patty Loveless – lead vocals
 Carmella Ramsey – background vocals
 Biff Watson – acoustic guitar

Chart performance

Weekly charts

Year-end charts

References

1999 greatest hits albums
Albums produced by Emory Gordy Jr.
Patty Loveless compilation albums
Epic Records compilation albums